R410 road may refer to:

 R410 road (Ireland)
 R410 road (South Africa)